Ayade Benedict Bengiuoshuye,  (born 2 March 1968) is a Nigerian politician who served as the governor of Cross Rivers state from 2015 to 2023, having previously served as senator for Cross Rivers North from 2011 to 2015.

Early life

He was born in Obudu LGA of Cross River State on the 2nd of March, 1968 to Mr. Peter Akinsheye Ayade and Mrs. Beatrice Ngayi Ayade. He hails from Kakum Village, Ipong Ward of Obudu Local Government Area of Cross River State, Nigeria. His parents were both devout Catholics. His father worked as a public servant with the water board.

Education

Benedict Ayade received his primary education at St. Stephens Primary School, Obudu, and proceeded to Government Secondary School, Obudu, Nigeria, for his secondary education.

Ayade earned his B.Sc. (Honours) from the University of Ibadan in Ibadan, Nigeria  (1984–1988). He then proceeded to obtain his M.Sc. in microbiology (1989–1990) and subsequently his Ph.D. in environmental microbiology from the same University of Ibadan (1990–1994), winning the Best Doctoral Dissertation Award in Environmental Microbiology. Ayade also has an MBA (2000–2002) from Ambrose Alli University Ekpoma, Edo State. Ayade is a lawyer with an LL.B. law degree (2006–2010) from Delta State University, Abraka. Ayade went on to work as a lecturer at Delta State University, Abraka, where he was subsequently appointed professor.

From his work in groundwater remediation in Nigeria, Ayade invented a sewage treatment plant powered by solar energy.

Appointments/political career

 Chairman of Ecological Fund
 Chairman of International Institute of Environmental Research
 Member of Strategic Policy Advisory Council
 Member of Nigeria Association of Petroleum Engineers
 Member of Cross River State Poverty Alleviation Board
Ayade ventured into politics when he ran for a seat in the Nigerian Senate in the  2011 elections as a member of the PDP.  Ayade was elected by accumulating a total of 91,123 votes.

During his term in the Senate, Ayade held the position of vice-chairman, Senate Committee on Environment and Ecology.  He was also a member of other committees such as Petroleum Downstream, Education, Drugs/Narcotics/Crime etc.

Ayade won the gubernatorial poll again on the platform of the People's Democratic Party (PDP) in the April 2015 elections in Cross River State, having polled 342,016 votes ahead of the All Progressives Congress candidate in the state, Odey Ochicha, with 53,983 votes.

Ayade recontested in the 2019 gubernatorial elections as a member of the People Democratic Party (PDP) and was reelected as the governor of Cross River State.

Awards 
Ayade was awarded the 2016 Vanguard Governor of the Year.

Ayade was awarded the 2019 Champion Newspaper Governor of the Year.

Ayade was awarded the 2020 Leadership newspaper Governor of the year.

Ayade was also awarded the Blueprint Newspaper Governor of the Year on Agro-industrializatihin 2021. The e award was in recognition of his developmental strides on Agro-industrialization.

On 24 August 2019, Ayade was invested as the Knight of St. John (KSJ) International by the Roman Catholic Church, Sacred Heart Cathedral, the seat of the Metropolitan Archdiocese of Calabar.

In October 2022, he was awarded a national honour of Commander of the Order of the Niger (CON) by president Muhammadu Buhari.

Family and personal life
Ayade is married to Dr. Linda Ayade and has 3 children. His hobbies include reading, playing and watching games, as well as dancing.

See also
List of Governors of Cross River State

References

Living people
1969 births
Ambrose Alli University alumni
Delta State University, Abraka alumni
People from Cross River State
Peoples Democratic Party members of the Senate (Nigeria)
Peoples Democratic Party state governors of Nigeria
University of Ibadan alumni